Carol & Company is an American comedy anthology television series starring Carol Burnett, Jeremy Piven, Meagen Fay, Terry Kiser, Anita Barone, Richard Kind and Peter Krause that aired for two seasons on NBC from March 31, 1990, to July 20, 1991.

Overview
Carol & Company began as a mid-season replacement from March 31 to June 2, 1990, and was subsequently picked up for a full season which ran from September 22, 1990, until July 20, 1991.

Unlike Carol Burnett's previous variety shows, Carol & Company was an anthology series which applied an unusual repertory approach to television comedy. Every week, Burnett and her fellow players (Krause, Piven, Fay, Kiser, Barone and Kind) performed a different half-hour comedy playlet. Only the performers remained the same from week to week; there were no ongoing characters or plots, although there were guest stars from time to time including Betty White, Christopher Reeve, Swoosie Kurtz and Burnett's daughter Carrie Hamilton. In 1991, Burnett's cohort, Tim Conway, made a cameo appearance as an audience member in the episode, "That Little Extra Something."

Shortly after the series' cancellation, Burnett switched back to her former network CBS to star in a short-lived revival of The Carol Burnett Show which aired from November 1 to December 27, 1991. It featured a new ensemble cast, including two Carol & Company players (Meagen Fay and Richard Kind) along with Jessica Lundy, Rick Aviles, Chris Barnes, Roger Kabler and weekly guest stars such as Vicki Lawrence, Martin Short, B.B. King and Jim Nabors. However, the series failed to catch on with the public and only nine episodes of this revival were aired.

Episodes

Season 1 (1990)

Season 2 (1990–91)

Guest stars
Robert Urich as Mr. Sammy 
David Strassman as Joe  
Christopher Reeve as Drew
Neil Patrick Harris as Will
Betty White as Betty
Bernadette Peters as Herself 
Alex Rocco as Jimmy 
Nell Carter as Molly
Swoosie Kurtz as Emma
Glenda Jackson as Tina
Tim Conway as Bob
Howie Mandel as Howie 
Carrie Hamilton
Dennis Burkley
Martin Ferrero
Richard Karn
Pat Crawford Brown
Burt Reynolds

Broadcast history
March 1990 – April 1990: NBC Saturday, 9:30–10:00 PM
April 1990 – June 1990: NBC Saturday, 10:00–10:30 PM
August 1990 – March 1991: NBC Saturday, 10:00–10:30 PM
March 1991 – May 1991: NBC Saturday, 10:00-11:00 PM
July 1991: NBC Saturday, 10:30–11:00 PM

Awards and nominations

References

External links

1990 American television series debuts
1991 American television series endings
1990s American comedy television series
1990s American anthology television series
NBC original programming
Television series by ABC Studios
Carol Burnett
Television shows set in New York City